Blondie Pienaar (12 May 1926 – June 2004) was a South African wrestler. He competed in the men's freestyle lightweight at the 1952 Summer Olympics.

References

1926 births
2004 deaths
South African male sport wrestlers
Olympic wrestlers of South Africa
Wrestlers at the 1952 Summer Olympics
Place of birth missing
Commonwealth Games medallists in wrestling
Commonwealth Games gold medallists for South Africa
Wrestlers at the 1954 British Empire and Commonwealth Games
Medallists at the 1954 British Empire and Commonwealth Games